Arthur Link may refer to:

Arthur A. Link (1914–2010), Governor of North Dakota
Arthur S. Link (1920–1998), American historian